Södermalms IP  is a football stadium in Skövde, Sweden  and the home stadium for the football team Skövde AIK. Södermalms IP has a total capacity of 4,646 spectators.

References 

Football venues in Sweden
Skövde AIK